Piriqueta is a genus of flowering plants belonging to Turneroideae (Passifloraceae).

Its native range is Tropical and Subtropical America, Europe to Central Asia and Turkey.

Species 

Piriqueta abairana 
Piriqueta araguaiana 
Piriqueta asperifolia 
Piriqueta assurensis 
Piriqueta aurea 
Piriqueta breviseminata 
Piriqueta caiapoensis 
Piriqueta carnea 
Piriqueta cistoides 
Piriqueta constellata 
Piriqueta corumbensis 
Piriqueta crenata 
Piriqueta cristobaliae 
Piriqueta densiflora 
Piriqueta dentata 
Piriqueta douradinha 
Piriqueta duarteana 
Piriqueta emasensis 
Piriqueta flammea 
Piriqueta grandifolia 
Piriqueta guianensis 
Piriqueta hapala 
Piriqueta lourteigiae 
Piriqueta mesoamericana 
Piriqueta mexicana 
Piriqueta morongii 
Piriqueta mortonii 
Piriqueta nanuzae 
Piriqueta nitida 
Piriqueta ochroleuca 
Piriqueta pampeana 
Piriqueta plicata 
Piriqueta racemosa 
Piriqueta revoluta 
Piriqueta rosea 
Piriqueta sarae 
Piriqueta scabrida 
Piriqueta sidifolia 
Piriqueta suborbicularis 
Piriqueta subsessilis 
Piriqueta sulfurea 
Piriqueta tamberlikii 
Piriqueta taubatensis 
Piriqueta undulata 
Piriqueta venezuelana 
Piriqueta viscosa

References

Passifloraceae
Malpighiales genera